The 2017–18 Washington State Cougars women's basketball team represents Washington State University during the 2017–18 NCAA Division I women's basketball season. The Cougars, led by eleventh year head coach June Daugherty, play their home games at the Beasley Coliseum and were members of the Pac-12 Conference. They finished the season 10–20, 3–14 in the Pac-12 to finish in tenth place. They lost in the first round of the Pac-12 women's tournament to USC.

On March 13, June Daugherty was fired. She finished at Washington State with a record of 130–218. WSU hired Northern Colorado head coach Kamie Ethridge on April 16.

Previous season
They finished the season 16–20, 6–12 in the Pac-12 to finish in a tie for seventh place. They advanced to the quarterfinals of the Pac-12 women's tournament where they lost to Stanford. They were invited to the Women's National Invitation Tournament where they defeated BYU, Wyoming and UC Davis in the first, second and third rounds, Iowa in the quarterfinals before losing to Georgia Tech in the semifinals.

Roster

Schedule

|-
!colspan=9 style=| Exhibition

|-
!colspan=9 style=| Non-conference regular season

|-
!colspan=9 style=| Pac-12 regular season

|-
!colspan=9 style=| Pac-12 Women's Tournament

Rankings
2017–18 NCAA Division I women's basketball rankings

See also
 2017–18 Washington State Cougars men's basketball team

References

Washington State Cougars women's basketball seasons
Washington State
Washington State
Washington State